Zakia Soman is a women's rights activist from India and one of the founding members of Bharatiya Muslim Mahila Andolan, a membership based human rights movement.

Life 
Zakia is from Ahmedabad, Gujarat, in India. She worked as a university professor of Business Communication in English at the University of Gujarat.

Activism 
Zakia is an advocate of the rights of Muslim women. She has worked and written extensively on issues of peace and justice, secularism, human rights, and minority rights. She also set-up the Peace and Human Security theme in ActionAid. 

She is a member of South Asian Alliance for Poverty Eradication (SAAPE). She used to be a university professor in Gujarat before she quit her job and started working for minority rights. She is a founder of Centre for Peace Studies, which engages in knowledge activism for peace and tolerance.

Recognition 
In 2014, National Commission for Women awarded Zakia the Outstanding Women Achiever's Award. She has also featured in BBC's 100 Fearless Women in November 2015.

References

Year of birth missing (living people)
Living people
Indian women's rights activists
21st-century Indian women politicians
21st-century Indian politicians
Women human rights activists